Protomyctophum bolini is a species of lanternfish.

Distribution 
Circumpolar between Antarctic Divergence and Subtropical Convergence zone. Southeast Atlantic and Western Indian Ocean: between 41°40'-45°25'S, 17°17'-36°32'E

References

Lampanyctus
Fish described in 1949